Sandbank ( or Taigh a' Chladaich) is a village on the Cowal peninsula in Argyll and Bute, Scotland.

History

Robertsons Yachtbuilders

Alexander Robertson started repairing boats in a small workshop at Sandbank in 1876, and Alexander Robertson & Sons went on to become one of the foremost wooden boat builders on Scotland's River Clyde. The 'golden years' of Robertson's yard were in the early 1900s when they started building classic 12- and 15-metre racing yachts. Robertsons was well known for the quality of its workmanship and was chosen to build the first 15-metre yacht designed by William Fife (Shimna, 1907). More than 55 boats were built by Robertsons in preparation for the First World War and the yard remained busy even during the Great Depression in the 1930s, as many wealthy businessmen developed a passion for yacht racing on the Clyde. During World War II the yard was devoted to Admiralty work, producing a wide range of large high-speed Fairmile Marine Motor Boats. After the war the yard built the successful one-class Loch Longs and two David Boyd designed 12-metre challengers for the America's Cup: Sceptre (1958) and Sovereign (1964). Due to difficult business conditions the Robertson family sold the yard in 1965, and it was turned over to GRP production work until it closed in 1980. During its 104-year history, Robertson's Yard built 500 boats, many of which are still sailing today. The yard ceased trading in the early 1980s and the site was levelled soon after. The site has since been consumed by residential building and the new Holy Loch Marina development.

U.S. Navy years

Sandbank was the site of the shore facilities of the U.S. Navy submarine base in the Holy Loch from 1961 to 1992, part of the US Atlantic Fleet. It was, for 30 years, until the end of the Cold War, the home port of the U.S. Navy's Submarine Squadron 14 (SUBRON 14, short name). Nowadays, part of the old navy complex that was the former location of Morris & Lorimer's boat building yard, is a timber loading berth and marina.

Holy Loch Marina
Sandbank is the location of the Holy Loch Marina, a development with over 200 berths.

Cemetery
Cowal Cemetery is located on the high road (A885) between Sandbank and Dunoon. It was established in 1972.

Gallery

References

External links

 Holy Loch Marina - website

Villages in Cowal
Firth of Clyde
Highlands and Islands of Scotland